Robert Daundy (by 1500–1558), of Ipswich, Suffolk, was an English businessman and politician. He was closely associated with another Ipswich businessman, Henry Tooley.

He was a wealthy merchant of Ipswich, who was elected as chamberlain for the town against his will in 1521. Among the actions he took under this post, he was associated with the building of a new college for Ipswich, and for importing miscellaneous goods, including salt and tallow. In late 1537, Daundy became involved in a dispute with the abbot of Furness over the seizure by the abbot's men of wines belonging, rightfully, to him. Oliver Cromwell intervened to the end that the cargo was restored to its virtuous and rightful owner, Daundy. He was elected as a Member of Parliament (MP) for Ipswich in 1539.

References

15th-century births
1558 deaths
Members of the Parliament of England (pre-1707) for Ipswich
English MPs 1539–1540